Alma Pöysti (born 16 March 1981) is a Swedish-speaking Finnish actor. She is the daughter of director Erik Pöysti  and granddaughter of Finnish actors Lasse Pöysti and Birgitta Ulfsson. Pöysti has also lived and worked in Sweden.

Biography 
Pöysti studied at the University of the Arts Helsinki from 2003 to 2007 before working at the Swedish Theatre and the Finnish National Theatre.

In 2020 she played Tove Jansson in a biopic titled Tove.

Filmography 

 Fling (2004)
 Where Once We Walked (2011)
 Naked Harbour (2012)
 Animal Day (short) (2012)
 Dagmamman (2013)
 Kristuksen morsian (2014)
 Moomins on the Riviera (Finnish version) (Voice) (2014)
 Luolasto (2014)
 Tsamo (2015)
 Det går att operera (short) (2015)
 Flowers of Evil (2016)
 Liberty (2018)
 Explosionen av en badring (short) (2020)
 Tre berättelser om långtan (2020)
 Comet in Moominland (2020 remaster)
 Tove (2020)

References

External links 

 

Film people from Helsinki
1981 births
Actresses from Helsinki
Living people
Finnish people of Swedish descent
Finnish people of German descent
Finnish expatriates in Sweden
Swedish-speaking Finns